Parkinson's disease (PD), or simply Parkinson's, is a long-term degenerative disorder of the central nervous system that mainly affects the motor system. The symptoms usually emerge slowly, and as the disease worsens, non-motor symptoms become more common. The most obvious early symptoms are tremor, rigidity, slowness of movement, and difficulty with walking. Cognitive and behavioral problems may also occur with depression, anxiety, and apathy occurring in many people with PD. Parkinson's disease dementia becomes common in the advanced stages of the disease. Those with Parkinson's can also have problems with their sleep and sensory systems. The motor symptoms of the disease result from the death of nerve cells in the substantia nigra, a region of the midbrain, leading to a dopamine deficit. The cause of this cell death is poorly understood, but involves the build-up of misfolded proteins into Lewy bodies in the neurons. Collectively, the main motor symptoms are also known as parkinsonism or a parkinsonian syndrome.

The cause of PD is unknown, but a combination of genetic factors, and environmental factors are believed to play a role. Those with an affected family member are at an increased risk of getting the disease, with certain genes known to be inheritable risk factors. Environmental risk factors of note are exposure to pesticides, and prior head injuries. A history of exposure to trichloroethylene is a suspected risk factor. Coffee drinkers, tea drinkers, and tobacco smokers are at a reduced risk.

Diagnosis of typical cases is mainly based on symptoms, with motor symptoms being the chief complaint. Tests such as neuroimaging (magnetic resonance imaging or imaging to look at dopamine neuronal dysfunction known as DaT scan) can be used to help rule out other diseases. Parkinson's disease typically occurs in people over the age of 60, of whom about one percent are affected. Males are more often affected than females at a ratio of around 3:2. When it is seen in people before the age of 50, it is called early-onset PD. By 2015, PD affected 6.2 million people and resulted in about 117,400 deaths globally. The number of people with PD older than fifty is expected to double by 2030. The average life expectancy following diagnosis is between 7 and 15 years.

No cure for PD is known; treatment aims to reduce the effects of the symptoms. Initial treatment is typically with the medications levodopa (L-DOPA), MAO-B inhibitors, or dopamine agonists. As the disease progresses, these medications become less effective, while at the same time producing a side effect marked by involuntary muscle movements. At that time, medications may be used in combination and doses may be increased. Diet and certain forms of rehabilitation have shown some effectiveness at improving symptoms. Surgery to place microelectrodes for deep brain stimulation has been used to reduce motor symptoms in severe cases where drugs are ineffective. Evidence for treatments for the nonmovement-related symptoms of PD, such as sleep disturbances and emotional problems, is less strong.

The disease is named after English doctor James Parkinson, who published the first detailed description in An Essay on the Shaking Palsy, in 1817. Public awareness campaigns include World Parkinson's Day (on the birthday of James Parkinson, 11 April) and the use of a red tulip as the symbol of the disease. People with PD who have increased the public's awareness of the condition include boxer Muhammad Ali, comedian Billy Connolly, actor Michael J. Fox, Olympic cyclist Davis Phinney, and actor Alan Alda.

Classification
Parkinson's disease is the most common form of parkinsonism and is sometimes called idiopathic parkinsonism, meaning that it has no identifiable cause. Parkinson's disease is a neurodegenerative disease classed as a synucleinopathy, and more specifically as an alpha-synucleinopathy (αsynucleinopathy) due to the accumulation of a misfolded protein alpha-synuclein in the brain, and its spread throughout the brain.

There are other Parkinson-plus syndromes that can have similar movement symptoms, but have a variety of associated symptoms.  Some of these are also synucleinopathies.  Lewy body dementia involves motor symptoms with early onset of cognitive dysfunction and hallucinations, with these often (though not necessarily) preceding the motor symptoms.  Alternatively, multiple systems atrophy or MSA usually has early onset of autonomic dysfunction (such as orthostasis), and may have autonomic predominance, cerebellar symptom predominance, or Parkinsonian predominance.

Other Parkinson-plus syndromes involve tau, rather than alpha-synuclein. These include progressive supranuclear palsy (PSP) and corticobasal syndrome (CBS). PSP predominantly involves rigidity, early falls, bulbar symptoms, and vertical gaze restriction; it can also be associated with frontotemporal dementia symptoms. CBS involves asymmetric parkinsonism, dystonia, alien limb, and myoclonic jerking. These unique presentation timelines and associated symptoms can help differentiate these similar movement disorders from idiopathic Parkinson disease.

Signs and symptoms

The most recognizable symptoms are movement (motor) related, and include tremor, bradykinesia, rigidity, and shuffling/stooped gait. Non-motor symptoms, including autonomic dysfunction (dysautonomia), neuropsychiatric problems (mood, cognition, behavior or thought alterations), and sensory (especially altered sense of smell) and sleep difficulties may be present as well.  Patients may have nonmotor symptoms that precede the onset of motor symptoms by several years, such as constipation, anosmia, and REM Behavior Disorder. Generally, symptoms such as dementia, psychosis, orthostasis, and more severe falls do not occur until later. Dysphagia can begin at any time during the course of Parkinson's, and sooner or later affects more than 80% of patients.

Motor

Four motor symptoms are considered as cardinal signs in PD: tremor, slowness of movement (bradykinesia), rigidity, and postural instability.

The most common presenting sign is a coarse, slow tremor of the hand at rest, which disappears during voluntary movement of the affected arm and in the deeper stages of sleep. It typically appears in only one hand, eventually affecting both hands as the disease progresses. Frequency of PD tremor is between 4 and 6 hertz (cycles per second). A common feature of tremor is pill-rolling, the tendency of the index finger and thumb to touch and perform together with a circular movement. The term derives from the similarity between the movement of people with PD and the early pharmaceutical technique of manually making pills.

Bradykinesia is found in every case of PD, and is due to disturbances in motor planning of movement initiation, and associated with difficulties along the whole course of the movement process, from planning to initiation to execution of a movement. Performance of sequential and simultaneous movement is impaired. Bradykinesia is the most handicapping symptom of Parkinson's disease, leading to difficulties with everyday tasks such as dressing, feeding, and bathing. It leads to particular difficulty in carrying out two independent motor activities at the same time, and can be made worse by emotional stress or concurrent illnesses. Paradoxically, people with PD can often ride a bicycle or climb stairs more easily than walk on the level. While most physicians may readily notice bradykinesia, formal assessment requires persons to do repetitive movements with their fingers and feet.

Rigidity is stiffness and resistance to limb movement caused by increased muscle tone, an excessive and continuous contraction of muscles. In parkinsonism, the rigidity can be uniform, known as lead-pipe rigidity, or ratcheted, known as cogwheel rigidity. The combination of tremor and increased tone is considered to be at the origin of cogwheel rigidity. Rigidity may be associated with joint pain; such pain being a frequent initial manifestation of the disease. In early stages of PD, rigidity is often asymmetrical and tends to affect the neck and shoulder muscles prior to the muscles of the face and extremities. With the progression of the disease, rigidity typically affects the whole body and reduces the ability to move.

Postural instability is typical in the later stages of the disease, leading to impaired balance and frequent falls, and secondarily to bone fractures, loss of confidence, and reduced mobility. Instability is often absent in the initial stages, especially in younger people, especially prior to the development of bilateral symptoms. Up to 40% of people diagnosed with PD may experience falls, and around 10% may have falls weekly, with the number of falls being related to the severity of PD.

Other recognized motor signs and symptoms include gait and posture disturbances such as festination (rapid shuffling steps and a forward-flexed posture when walking with no flexed arm swing). Other common signs include freezing of gait (brief arrests when the feet seem to get stuck to the floor, especially on turning or changing direction), a slurred, monotonous, quiet voice, mask-like facial expression, and handwriting that gets smaller and smaller.

Cognitive
PD causes neuropsychiatric disturbances ranging from mild to severe. They include disorders of cognition, mood, behavior, and thought. Cognitive disturbances can occur in the early stages or sometimes prior to diagnosis, and increase in prevalence with duration of the disease. The most common cognitive deficit is executive dysfunction, which can include problems with planning, cognitive flexibility, abstract thinking, rule acquisition, inhibiting inappropriate actions, initiating appropriate actions, working memory, and control of attention. Other cognitive difficulties include slowed cognitive processing speed, impaired recall, and impaired perception and estimation of time. Nevertheless, improvement appears when recall is aided by cues. Visuospatial difficulties are also part of the disease, seen for example when the individual is asked to perform tests of facial recognition and perception of the orientation of drawn lines.

A person with PD has two to six times the risk of dementia compared to the general population. Up to 78% of people with PD have Parkinson's disease dementia. The prevalence of dementia increases with age, and to a lesser degree, duration of the disease. Dementia is associated with a reduced quality of life in people with PD and their caregivers, increased mortality, and a higher probability of needing nursing home care.

Psychosis
Psychosis can be considered a symptom with a prevalence at its widest range from 26 to 83%. Hallucinations or delusions occur in about 50% of people with PD over the course of the illness, and may herald the emergence of dementia. These range from minor hallucinations – sense of passage (something quickly passing beside the person) or sense of presence (the perception of something/someone standing just to the side or behind the person) – to full blown vivid, formed visual hallucinations and paranoid ideation. Auditory hallucinations are uncommon in PD, and are rarely described as voices. Psychosis is now believed to be an integral part of the disease. A psychosis with delusions and associated delirium is a recognized complication of anti-Parkinson drug treatment and may also be caused by urinary-tract infections (as frequently occurs in the fragile elderly), but drugs and infection are not the only factors, and underlying brain pathology or changes in neurotransmitters or their receptors (e.g., acetylcholine, serotonin) are also thought to play a role in psychosis in PD.

Neuropsychiatric 
Behavior and mood alterations are more common in PD without cognitive impairment than in the general population and are usually present in PD with dementia. The most frequent mood difficulties are depression, apathy, and anxiety.

Depression has been estimated to appear in 20 to 35% of people with PD, and can appear at any stage of the disease. It can manifest with symptoms that are common to the disease process (fatigue, insomnia, and difficulty with concentration), which makes diagnosis difficult. The imbalance and changes in dopamine, serotonin, and noradrenergic hormones are known to be a primary cause of depression in PD-affected people. Another cause is the functional impairment that is caused by the disease. Symptoms of depression can include loss of interest, sadness, guilt, feelings of helplessness and hopelessness, guilt, and suicidal ideation. Suicidal ideation in PD-affected people is higher than in the general population, but suicidal attempts themselves are lower than in people with depression without PD. Risk factors for depression in PD can include disease onset under age 50, being a woman, previous history of depression, severe motor symptoms, and others.

Anxiety has been estimated to have a prevalence in PD-affected people usually around 30–40% and up to 60% has been found. It is often complex, consisting of symptoms specific to PD. Anxiety can often be higher during motor "off" periods (times when medication is not working as well as it did before) and is likely to be diagnosed after diagnosis due to dysfunction of neurotransmitter pathways. PD-affected people experience panic attacks more frequently compared to the general population. Both anxiety and depression have been found to be associated with decreased quality of life. Symptoms can range from mild and episodic to chronic with potential causes being abnormal gamma-aminobutyric acid levels and embarrassment or fear about symptoms or disease. Risk factors for anxiety in PD are disease onset under age 50, women, and off periods. There is no standard treatment for PD-associated anxiety.

Apathy and anhedonia can be defined as a loss of motivation and an impaired ability to experience pleasure, respectively. They are symptoms classically associated with depression, but they differ in PD-affected people in treatment and mechanism and do not always occur with depression. Apathy presents in around 16.5–40%. Symptoms of apathy include reduced initiative/interests in new activities or the world around them, emotional indifference, and loss of affection or concern for others. Apathy is associated with deficits in cognitive functions including executive and verbal memory. Anhedonia occurs in 5–75% of people with PD, depending on the study population assessed, and has a significant overlap with apathy.

Impulse-control disorders, including pathological gambling, compulsive sexual behavior, binge eating, compulsive shopping, and reckless generosity, can be caused by medication, particularly orally active dopamine agonists. The dopamine dysregulation syndrome – with wanting of medication leading to overuse – is a rare complication of levodopa use.

Punding, in which complicated, repetitive, aimless, stereotyped behaviors occur for many hours, is another disturbance caused by anti-Parkinson medication.

Gastrointestinal 
Gastrointestinal issues in Parkinson's disease include constipation, impaired stomach emptying (gastric dysmotility), and excessive production of saliva can be severe enough to cause discomfort or endanger health. Other upper gastrointestinal symptoms include swallowing impairment (Oropharyngeal dysphagia) and small intestinal bacterial overgrowth.

Invidividuals with Parkinson's have alpha-synuclein deposits in the digestive tract as well as the brain. Constipation is one of the symptoms associated with an increased risk of PD, and may precede diagnosis by several years.

Other

Sleep disorders are a feature of the disease and can be worsened by medications. Symptoms can manifest as daytime drowsiness (including sudden sleep attacks resembling narcolepsy), disturbances in Rapid eye movement sleep, or insomnia. REM behavior disorder, in which people act out dreams, sometimes injuring themselves or their bed partner, may begin many years before the development of motor or cognitive features of PD or dementia with Lewy bodies.

Alterations in the autonomic nervous system can lead to orthostatic hypotension (low blood pressure upon standing), oily skin, excessive sweating, urinary incontinence, and altered sexual function.

Changes in perception may include an impaired sense of smell, disturbed vision, pain, and paresthesia (tingling and numbness). All of these symptoms can occur years before diagnosis of the disease.

Causes

Many risk factors have been proposed, sometimes in relation to theories concerning possible mechanisms of the disease; however, none has been proven conclusively. The most frequently replicated relationships are an increased risk in those exposed to pesticides, and a reduced risk in smokers. A possible link exists between PD and Helicobacter pylori infection that can prevent the absorption of some drugs, including levodopa.

Genetic

Research indicates that PD results from a complex interaction between genetic and environmental factors. Around 15% of individuals with PD have a first-degree relative who has the disease, and 5–10% of people with PD are known to have forms of the disease that occur because of a mutation in one of several specific genes. Harboring one of these gene mutations may not lead to the disease; susceptibility factors put the individual at an increased risk, often in combination with other risk factors, which also affect age of onset, severity and progression. At least 11 autosomal dominant and 9 autosomal recessive gene mutations have been implicated in the development of PD. The autosomal dominant genes include SNCA, PARK3, UCHL1, LRRK2, GIGYF2, HTRA2, EIF4G1, TMEM230, CHCHD2, RIC3, and VPS35. Autosomal recessive genes include PRKN, PINK1, PARK7, ATP13A2, PLA2G6, FBXO7, DNAJC6, SYNJ1, and VPS13C. Some genes are X-linked or have unknown inheritance pattern; those include PARK10, PARK12, and PARK16. A 22q11 deletion is also known to be associated with PD. An autosomal dominant form has been associated with mutations in the LRP10 gene.

About 5% of people with PD have mutations in the GBA1 gene. These mutations are present in less than 1% of the unaffected population. The risk of developing PD is increased 20–30-fold if these mutations are present. PD associated with these mutations has the same clinical features, but an earlier age of onset and a more rapid cognitive and motor decline. This gene encodes glucocerebrosidase. Low levels of this enzyme cause Gaucher's disease.

SNCA gene mutations are important in PD because the protein this gene encodes, alpha-synuclein, is the main component of the Lewy bodies that accumulate in the brains of people with PD. Alpha-synuclein activates ataxia telangiectasia mutated, a major DNA damage-repair signaling kinase. In addition, alpha-synuclein activates the non-homologous end joining DNA repair pathway. The aggregation of alpha-synuclein in Lewy bodies appears to be a link between reduced DNA repair and brain-cell death in PD.

Mutations in some genes, including SNCA, LRRK2, and GBA, have been found to be risk factors for sporadic (nonfamilial) PD. Mutations in the gene LRRK2 are the most common known cause of familial and sporadic PD, accounting for around 5% of individuals with a family history of the disease and 3% of sporadic cases. A mutation in GBA presents the greatest genetic risk of developing Parkinsons disease.

Several Parkinson-related genes are involved in the function of lysosomes, organelles that digest cellular waste products. Some cases of PD may be caused by lysosomal disorders that reduce the ability of cells to break down alpha-synuclein.

Non-genetic

Exposure to pesticides and a history of head injury have each been linked with PD, but the risks are modest. Never drinking caffeinated beverages is also associated with small increases in risk of developing PD. Some toxins can cause parkinsonism, including manganese and carbon disulfide.

Medical drugs are implicated in cases of parkinsonism. Drug-induced parkinsonism is normally reversible by stopping the offending agent, such as phenothiazines (chlorpromazine, promazine, etc.); butyrophenones (haloperidol, benperidol, etc.); metoclopramide and Tetrabenazine. 1-Methyl-4-phenyl-1,2,3,6-tetrahydropyridine (MPTP) is a drug known for causing irreversible parkinsonism that is commonly used in animal-model research.

Low concentrations of urate in the blood are associated with an increased risk of PD.

Other identifiable causes of parkinsonism include infections and metabolic derangement. Several neurodegenerative disorders also may present with parkinsonism, and are sometimes referred to as atypical parkinsonism or parkinson plus syndromes (illnesses with parkinsonism plus some other features distinguishing them from PD). They include multiple system atrophy, progressive supranuclear palsy, corticobasal degeneration, and dementia with Lewy bodies. Dementia with Lewy bodies is another synucleinopathy and it has close pathological similarities with PD, especially with the subset of PD cases with dementia known as Parkinson's disease dementia. The relationship between PD and DLB is complex and incompletely understood. They may represent parts of a continuum, with variable distinguishing clinical and pathological features, or they may prove to be separate diseases.

Vascular parkinsonism is the phenomenon of the presence of Parkinson's disease symptoms combined with findings of vascular events (such as a cerebral stroke). The damaging of the dopaminergic pathways is similar in cause for both vascular parkinsonism and idiopathic PD, so they can present with many of the same symptoms. Differentiation can be made with careful bedside examination, history evaluation, and imaging.

Pathophysiology

The main pathological characteristics of PD are cell death in the brain's basal ganglia (affecting up to 70% of the dopamine-secreting neurons in the substantia nigra pars compacta by the end of life). In Parkinson's disease, alpha-synuclein becomes misfolded and clump together with other alpha-synuclein. Cells are unable to remove these clumps, and the alpha-synuclein becomes cytotoxic, damaging the cells. These clumps can be seen in neurons under a microscope and are called Lewy bodies. Loss of neurons is accompanied by the death of astrocytes (star-shaped glial cells) and a significant increase in the number of microglia (another type of glial cell) in the substantia nigra. Braak staging is a way to explain the progression of the parts of the brain affected by PD. According to this staging, PD starts in the medulla and the olfactory bulb before moving to the substantia nigra pars compacta and the rest of the midbrain/basal forebrain. Movement symptom onset is associated when the disease begins to affect the substantia nigra pars compacta.

Five major pathways in the brain connect other brain areas with the basal ganglia. These are known as the motor, oculomotor, associative, limbic, and orbitofrontal circuits, with names indicating the main projection area of each circuit. All of them are affected in PD, and their disruption explains many of the symptoms of the disease, since these circuits are involved in a wide variety of functions, including movement, attention and learning. Scientifically, the motor circuit has been examined the most intensively.

A particular conceptual model of the motor circuit and its alteration with PD has been of great influence since 1980, although some limitations have been pointed out which have led to modifications. In this model, the basal ganglia normally exert a constant inhibitory influence on a wide range of motor systems, preventing them from becoming active at inappropriate times. When a decision is made to perform a particular action, inhibition is reduced for the required motor system, thereby releasing it for activation. Dopamine acts to facilitate this release of inhibition, so high levels of dopamine function tend to promote motor activity, while low levels of dopamine function, such as occur in PD, demand greater exertions of effort for any given movement. Thus, the net effect of dopamine depletion is to produce hypokinesia, an overall reduction in motor output. Drugs that are used to treat PD, conversely, may produce excessive dopamine activity, allowing motor systems to be activated at inappropriate times and thereby producing dyskinesias.

Brain cell death
Brain cells could be lost by several proposed mechanisms. One mechanism consists of an abnormal accumulation of the protein alpha-synuclein bound to ubiquitin in the damaged cells. This insoluble protein accumulates inside neurons forming inclusions called Lewy bodies. According to the Braak staging, a classification of the disease based on pathological findings proposed by Heiko Braak, Lewy bodies first appear in the olfactory bulb, medulla oblongata, and pontine tegmentum; individuals at this stage may be asymptomatic or may have early nonmotor symptoms (such as loss of sense of smell, or some sleep or automatic dysfunction). As the disease progresses, Lewy bodies develop in the substantia nigra, areas of the midbrain and basal forebrain, and finally, the neocortex. These brain sites are the main places of neuronal degeneration in PD, but Lewy bodies may not cause cell death and they may be protective (with the abnormal protein sequestered or walled off). Other forms of alpha-synuclein (e.g., oligomers) that are not aggregated in Lewy bodies and Lewy neurites may actually be the toxic forms of the protein. In people with dementia, a generalized presence of Lewy bodies is common in cortical areas. Neurofibrillary tangles and senile plaques, characteristic of Alzheimer's disease, are not common unless the person is demented.

Other cell-death mechanisms include proteasomal and lysosomal systems dysfunction and reduced mitochondrial activity. Iron accumulation in the substantia nigra is typically observed in conjunction with the protein inclusions. It may be related to oxidative stress, protein aggregation, and neuronal death, but the mechanisms are not fully understood.

The neuroimmune connection 
The neuroimmune interaction is heavily implicated in PD pathology. PD and autoimmune disorders share several genetic variations and molecular pathways. Some autoimmune diseases may even increase one's risk of developing PD, up to 33% in one study. Autoimmune diseases linked to protein expression profiles of monocytes and CD4+ T cells are also linked to PD. There is some evidence that Herpes virus infections can trigger autoimmune reactions to alpha-synuclein, perhaps through molecular mimicry of viral proteins. Alpha-synuclein, and its aggregate form Lewy bodies, can also bind to microglia. Microglia can proliferate and be over-activated by alpha-synuclein binding to MHC receptors on inflammasomes, leading to a release of proinflammatory cytokines like IL-1β, IFNγ, and TNFα. Activated microglia also influence the activation of astrocytes, converting their neuroprotective phenotype to a neurotoxic one. Astrocytes in healthy brains serve to protect neuronal connections. In PD patients, astrocytes cannot protect the dopaminergic connections in the striatum. Microglia also present antigens via MHC-I and MHC-II to T cells. CD4+ T cells, activated by this process, are able to cross the blood brain barrier (BBB) and release more proinflammatory cytokines, like interferon-γ (IFNγ), TNFα, and IL-1β. Mast cell degranulation and subsequent proinflammatory cytokine release is also implicated in BBB breakdown in PD. Another immune cell implicated in PD are peripheral monocytes and have been found in the substantia nigra of PD patients. These monocytes can lead to more dopaminergic connection breakdown. In addition, monocytes isolated from PD patients express higher levels of the PD-associated protein, LRRK2, compared to non-PD individuals via vasodilation. In addition, high levels of pro-inflammatory cytokines, such as IL-6, can lead to the production of C-reactive protein by the liver, another protein commonly found in PD patients, that can lead to an increase in peripheral inflammation. Peripheral inflammation can also affect the gut-brain axis, an area of the body highly implicated in PD. PD patients often have altered gut microbiota and colon problems years before motor issues arise. Alpha-synuclein is created in the gut and may migrate via the vagus nerve to the brainstem and then to the substantia nigra. Furthermore, the bacteria Proteus mirabilis has been associated with higher levels of alpha-synuclein and an increase of motor symptoms in PD patients. Further elucidation of the causal role of alpha-synuclein, the role of inflammation, the gut-brain axis, as well as an understanding of the individual differences in immune stress responses is needed to better understand the pathological development of PD.

Diagnosis
A physician initially assesses for PD with a careful medical history and neurological examination. Focus is put on confirming motor symptoms (bradykinesia, rest tremor, etc.) and supporting tests with clinical diagnostic criteria. The finding of Lewy bodies in the midbrain on autopsy is usually considered final proof that the person had PD. The clinical course of the illness over time may reveal it is not PD, requiring that the clinical presentation be periodically reviewed to confirm the accuracy of the diagnosis.

Multiple causes can occur for parkinsonism or diseases that look similar. Stroke, certain medications, and toxins can cause "secondary parkinsonism" and need to be assessed during visit. Parkinson-plus syndromes, such as progressive supranuclear palsy and multiple system atrophy, must also be considered and ruled out appropriately due to different treatment and disease progression (anti-Parkinson's medications are typically less effective at controlling symptoms in Parkinson-plus syndromes). Faster progression rates, early cognitive dysfunction or postural instability, minimal tremor, or symmetry at onset may indicate a Parkinson-plus disease rather than PD itself.

Medical organizations have created diagnostic criteria to ease and standardize the diagnostic process, especially in the early stages of the disease. The most widely known criteria come from the UK Queen Square Brain Bank for Neurological Disorders and the U.S. National Institute of Neurological Disorders and Stroke. The Queen Square Brain Bank criteria require slowness of movement (bradykinesia) plus either rigidity, resting tremor, or postural instability. Other possible causes of these symptoms need to be ruled out. Finally, three or more of the following supportive features are required during onset or evolution: unilateral onset, tremor at rest, progression in time, asymmetry of motor symptoms, response to levodopa for at least five years, the clinical course of at least ten years and appearance of dyskinesias induced by the intake of excessive levodopa. Assessment of sudomotor function through electrochemical skin conductance can be helpful in diagnosing dysautonomia.

When PD diagnoses are checked by autopsy, movement disorders experts are found on average to be 79.6% accurate at initial assessment and 83.9% accurate after they have refined their diagnoses at follow-up examinations. When clinical diagnoses performed mainly by nonexperts are checked by autopsy, the average accuracy is 73.8%. Overall, 80.6% of PD diagnoses are accurate, and 82.7% of diagnoses using the Brain Bank criteria are accurate.

Imaging
Computed tomography (CT) scans of people with PD usually appear normal. Magnetic resonance imaging has become more accurate in diagnosis of the disease over time, specifically through iron-sensitive T2* and susceptibility weighted imaging sequences at a magnetic field strength of at least 3T, both of which can demonstrate absence of the characteristic 'swallow tail' imaging pattern in the dorsolateral substantia nigra. In a meta-analysis, absence of this pattern was highly sensitive and specific for the disease. A meta-analysis found that neuromelanin-MRI can discriminate individuals with Parkinson's from healthy subjects. Diffusion MRI has shown potential in distinguishing between PD and Parkinson-plus syndromes, as well as between PD motor subtypes, though its diagnostic value is still under investigation. CT and MRI are also used to rule out other diseases that can be secondary causes of parkinsonism, most commonly encephalitis and chronic ischemic insults, as well as less frequent entities such as basal ganglia tumors and hydrocephalus.

The metabolic activity of dopamine transporters in the basal ganglia can be directly measured with positron emission tomography and single-photon emission computed tomography scans, with the DaTSCAN being a common proprietary version of this study. It has shown high agreement with clinical diagnoses of PD. Reduced dopamine-related activity in the basal ganglia can help exclude drug-induced Parkinsonism. This finding is not entirely specific, however, and can be seen with both PD and Parkinson-plus disorders. In the United States, DaTSCANs are only FDA approved to distinguish PD or Parkinsonian syndromes from essential tremor.

Iodine-123-meta-iodobenzylguanidine myocardial scintigraphy can help find denervation of the muscles around the heart, which can support a PD diagnosis.

Differential diagnosis
Secondary parkinsonism – The multiple causes of parkinsonism can be differentiated between with careful history, physical examination, and appropriate imaging. This topic is further discussed in the causes section here.

Parkinson-plus syndrome – Multiple diseases can be considered part of the Parkinson's plus group, including corticobasal syndrome, multiple system atrophy, progressive supranuclear palsy, and dementia with Lewy bodies. Differential diagnosis can be narrowed down with careful history and physical (especially focused on onset of specific symptoms), progression of the disease, and response to treatment. Some key features between them:
 Corticobasal syndrome – levodopa-resistance, myoclonus, dystonia, corticosensory loss, apraxia, and non-fluent aphasia
 Dementia with Lewy bodies – levodopa resistance, cognitive predominance before motor symptoms, and fluctuating cognitive symptoms, (visual hallucinations are very common in this disease, but PD patients also have them)
 Essential tremor – This can at first look like parkinsonism, but has key differentiators. In essential tremor, the tremor gets worse with action (whereas in PD, it gets better), a lack of other symptoms is common in PD, and normal DatSCAN is seen.
 Multiple system atrophy – levodopa resistance, rapidly progressive, autonomic failure, stridor, present Babinski sign, cerebellar ataxia, and specific MRI findings
 Progressive supranuclear palsy – levodopa resistance, restrictive vertical gaze, specific MRI findings, and early and different postural difficulties

Other conditions that can have similar presentations to PD include:

 Arthritis
 Creutzfeldt–Jakob disease
 Depression
 Dystonia
 Fragile X-associated tremor/ataxia syndrome
 Frontotemporal dementia and parkinsonism linked to chromosome 17
 Huntington's disease
 Idiopathic basal ganglia calcification
 Neurodegeneration with brain iron accumulation
 Normal-pressure hydrocephalus
 Obsessional slowness
 Psychogenic parkinsonism
 Wilson's disease

Prevention
Exercise in middle age may reduce the risk of PD later in life. Caffeine also appears protective with a greater decrease in risk occurring with a larger intake of caffeinated beverages such as coffee.

Antioxidants, such as vitamins C and E, have been proposed to protect against the disease, but results of studies have been contradictory and no positive effect has been shown. The results regarding fat and fatty acids have been contradictory, with various studies reporting protective, risk-increasing, or no effects. There have been preliminary indications that the use of nonsteroidal anti-inflammatory drugs (NSAIDs) and calcium channel blockers may be protective. A 2010 meta-analysis found that NSAIDs (apart from aspirin), have been associated with at least a 15% (higher in long-term and regular users) reduction in the incidence of the development of PD. There is a growing body of evidence linking this neuroprotective effect of NSAIDs in PD but as of 2019 meta-analyses have failed to confirm this link. However, multiple studies have demonstrated a link between the use of ibuprofen and a decreased risk of Parkinson's development.

Management

No cure for Parkinson's disease is known. Medications, surgery, and physical treatment may provide relief, improve the quality of a person's life, and are much more effective than treatments available for other neurological disorders such as Alzheimer's disease, motor neuron disease, and Parkinson-plus syndromes. The main families of drugs useful for treating motor symptoms are levodopa always combined with a dopa decarboxylase inhibitor and sometimes also with a COMT inhibitor, dopamine agonists, and MAO-B inhibitors. The stage of the disease and the age at disease onset determine which group is most useful.

Braak staging of PD uses six stages that can identify early, middle, and late stages. The initial stage in which some disability has already developed and requires pharmacological treatment is followed by later stages associated with the development of complications related to levodopa usage, and a third stage when symptoms unrelated to dopamine deficiency or levodopa treatment may predominate.

Treatment in the first stage aims for an optimal trade-off between symptom control and treatment side effects. The start of levodopa treatment may be postponed by initially using other medications, such as MAO-B inhibitors and dopamine agonists, instead, in the hope of delaying the onset of complications due to levodopa use. Levodopa is still the most effective treatment for the motor symptoms of PD, though, and should not be delayed in people when their quality of life is impaired. Levodopa-related dyskinesias correlate more strongly with duration and severity of the disease than duration of levodopa treatment, so delaying this therapy may not provide much longer dyskinesia-free time than early use.

In later stages, the aim is to reduce PD symptoms, while controlling fluctuations in the effect of the medication. Sudden withdrawals from medication or its overuse must be managed. When oral medications are not enough to control symptoms, surgery, (deep brain stimulation or more recently high-intensity focused ultrasound), subcutaneous waking-day apomorphine infusion, and enteral dopa pumps may be useful. Late-stage PD presents many challenges requiring a variety of treatments, including those for psychiatric symptoms particularly depression, orthostatic hypotension, bladder dysfunction, and erectile dysfunction. In the final stages of the disease, palliative care is provided to improve a person's quality of life.

A 2020 Cochrane review found no certain evidence that cognitive training is beneficial for people with Parkinson's disease, dementia or mild cognitive impairment. The findings are based on low certainty evidence of seven studies.

Medications

Levodopa
Levodopa is usually the first drug of choice when treating Parkinson's disease and has been the most widely used PD treatment since the 1980s. The motor symptoms of PD are the result of reduced dopamine production in the brain's basal ganglia. Dopamine does not cross the blood–brain barrier, so it cannot be taken as a medicine to boost the brain's depleted levels of dopamine, but a precursor of dopamine, levodopa, can pass through to the brain, where it is readily converted to dopamine, and administration of levodopa temporarily diminishes the motor symptoms of PD.

Only 5–10% of levodopa crosses the blood–brain barrier. Much of the remainder is metabolized to dopamine elsewhere in the body, causing a variety of side effects, including nausea, vomiting, and orthostatic hypotension. Carbidopa and benserazide are dopa decarboxylase inhibitors that do not cross the blood–brain barrier and inhibit the conversion of levodopa to dopamine outside the brain, reducing side effects and improving the availability of levodopa for passage into the brain. One of these drugs is usually taken along with levodopa, often combined with levodopa in the same pill.

Long term use of levodopa to the development of complications, such as involuntary movements (dyskinesias) and fluctuations in the effectiveness of the medication. When fluctuations occur, a person can cycle through phases with good response to medication and reduced PD symptoms (on state), and phases with poor response to medication and significant PD symptoms (off state). Using lower doses of levodopa may reduce the risk and severity of these levodopa-induced complications. A former strategy to reduce levodopa-related dyskinesia and fluctuations was to withdraw levodopa medication for some time. This is now discouraged, since it can bring on dangerous side effects such as neuroleptic malignant syndrome. Most people with PD eventually need levodopa and later develop levodopa-induced fluctuations and dyskinesias. Adverse effects of levodopa, including dyskinesias, mistakenly influence patients and providers to delay treatment for as long as possible which reduces potential for optimal results.

Levodopa by itself is available in oral (tablets and capsules), oral inhalation, and infusion form. Inhaled levodopa can be used when oral levodopa therapy has reached a point where "off" periods have increased in length.

COMT inhibitors

During the course of PD, affected people can experience a wearing-off phenomenon, where they have a recurrence of symptoms after a dose of levodopa, but right before their next dose. Catechol-O-methyltransferase (COMT) is a protein that degrades levodopa before it can cross the blood–brain barrier and these inhibitors allow for more levodopa to cross. They are normally not used in the management of early symptoms, but can be used in conjunction with levodopa/carbidopa when a person is experiencing the wearing off-phenomenon with their motor symptoms.

Three COMT inhibitors are available to treat adults with PD and end-of-dose motor fluctuations – opicapone, entacapone, and tolcapone. Tolcapone has been available for several years, but its usefulness is limited by possible liver damage complications, so requires liver-function monitoring. Entacapone and opicapone have not been shown to cause significant alterations to liver function. Licensed preparations of entacapone contain entacapone alone or in combination with carbidopa and levodopa. Opicapone is a once-daily COMT inhibitor.

Dopamine agonists
Several dopamine agonists that bind to dopamine receptors in the brain have similar effects to levodopa. These were initially used as a complementary therapy to levodopa for individuals experiencing levodopa complications (on-off fluctuations and dyskinesias); they are now mainly used on their own as first therapy for the motor symptoms of PD with the aim of delaying the initiation of levodopa therapy, thus delaying the onset of levodopa's complications. Dopamine agonists include bromocriptine, pergolide, pramipexole, ropinirole, piribedil, cabergoline, apomorphine, and lisuride.

Though dopamine agonists are less effective than levodopa at controlling PD motor symptoms, they are usually effective enough to manage these symptoms in the first years of treatment. Dyskinesias due to dopamine agonists are rare in younger people who have PD, but along with other complications, become more common with older age at onset. Thus, dopamine agonists are the preferred initial treatment for younger-onset PD, and levodopa is preferred for older-onset PD.

Dopamine agonists produce significant, although usually mild, side effects, including drowsiness, hallucinations, insomnia, nausea, and constipation. Sometimes, side effects appear even at a minimal clinically effective dose, leading the physician to search for a different drug. Agonists have been related to impulse-control disorders (such as compulsive sexual activity, eating, gambling, and shopping) even more strongly than levodopa. They tend to be more expensive than levodopa.

Apomorphine, a dopamine agonist, may be used to reduce off periods and dyskinesia in late PD. It is administered only by intermittent injections or continuous subcutaneous infusions. Since secondary effects such as confusion and hallucinations are common, individuals receiving apomorphine treatment should be closely monitored. Two dopamine agonists administered through skin patches (lisuride and rotigotine) are useful for people in the initial stages and possibly to control off states in those in advanced states.

MAO-B inhibitors
MAO-B inhibitors (safinamide, selegiline and rasagiline) increase the amount of dopamine in the basal ganglia by inhibiting the activity of monoamine oxidase B, an enzyme that breaks down dopamine. They have been found to help alleviate motor symptoms when used as monotherapy (on their own); when used in conjunction with levodopa, they reduce the time spent in the off phase. Selegiline has been shown to delay the need for levodopa commencement, suggesting that it might be neuroprotective and slow the progression of the disease (but this has not been proven). An initial study indicated that selegiline in combination with levodopa increased the risk of death, but this has been refuted.

Common side effects are nausea, dizziness, insomnia, sleepiness, and (in selegiline and rasagiline) orthostatic hypotension. Along with dopamine, MAO-Bs are known to increase serotonin, so care must be taken when used with certain antidepressants due to a potentially dangerous condition known as serotonin syndrome.

Other drugs
Other drugs such as amantadine and anticholinergics may be useful as treatment of motor symptoms, but the evidence supporting them lacks quality, so they are not first-choice treatments. In addition to motor symptoms, PD is accompanied by a diverse range of symptoms. Several drugs have been used to treat some of these problems. Examples are the use of quetiapine for psychosis, cholinesterase inhibitors for dementia, and modafinil for excessive daytime sleepiness. In 2016, pimavanserin was approved for the management of PD psychosis. Doxepin and rasagline may reduce physical fatigue in PD.

Surgery

Treating motor symptoms with surgery was once a common practice, but since the discovery of levodopa, the number of operations has declined. Studies in the past few decades have led to great improvements in surgical techniques, so surgery is again being used in people with advanced PD for whom drug therapy is no longer sufficient. Surgery for PD can be divided in two main groups – lesional and deep brain stimulation (DBS). Target areas for DBS or lesions include the thalamus, globus pallidus, or subthalamic nucleus. DBS involves the implantation of a medical device called a neurostimulator, which sends electrical impulses to specific parts of the brain. DBS is recommended for people who have PD with motor fluctuations and tremor inadequately controlled by medication, or to those who are intolerant to medication, as long as they do not have severe neuropsychiatric problems. Other, less common surgical therapies involve intentional formation of lesions to suppress overactivity of specific subcortical areas. For example, pallidotomy involves surgical destruction of the globus pallidus to control dyskinesia.

Four areas of the brain have been treated with neural stimulators in PD. These are the globus pallidus interna, thalamus, subthalamic nucleus, and pedunculopontine nucleus. DBS of the globus pallidus interna improves motor function, while DBS of the thalamic DBS improves tremor, but has little effect on bradykinesia or rigidity. DBS of the subthalamic nucleus is usually avoided if a history of depression or neurocognitive impairment is present. DBS of the subthalamic nucleus is associated with a reduction in medication. Pedunculopontine nucleus DBS remains experimental at present. Generally, DBS is associated with 30–60% improvement in motor score evaluations.

Rehabilitation

Exercise programs are recommended in people with PD. Some evidence shows that speech or mobility problems can improve with rehabilitation, although studies are scarce and of low quality. Regular physical exercise with or without physical therapy can be beneficial to maintain and improve mobility, flexibility, strength, gait speed, and quality of life. When an exercise program is performed under the supervision of a physiotherapist, more improvements occur in motor symptoms, mental and emotional functions, daily living activities, and quality of life compared to a self-supervised exercise program at home. Clinical exercises may be an effective intervention targeting overall well-being of individuals with Parkinson's. Improvement in motor function and depression may happen.

In improving flexibility and range of motion for people experiencing rigidity, generalized relaxation techniques such as gentle rocking have been found to decrease excessive muscle tension. Other effective techniques to promote relaxation include slow rotational movements of the extremities and trunk, rhythmic initiation, diaphragmatic breathing, and meditation techniques. As for gait and addressing the challenges associated with the disease such as hypokinesia, shuffling, and decreased arm swing, physiotherapists have a variety of strategies to improve functional mobility and safety. Areas of interest concerning gait during rehabilitation programs focus on improving gait speed, the base of support, stride length, and trunk and arm-swing movement. Strategies include using assistive equipment (pole walking and treadmill walking), verbal cueing (manual, visual, and auditory), exercises (marching and PNF patterns), and altering environments (surfaces, inputs, open vs. closed). Strengthening exercises have shown improvements in strength and motor function for people with primary muscular weakness and weakness related to inactivity with mild to moderate PD, but reports show a significant interaction between strength and the time the medications were taken. Therefore, people with PD should perform exercises 45 minutes to one hour after medications when they are at their best. Also, due to the forward flexed posture, and respiratory dysfunctions in advanced PD, deep diaphragmatic breathing exercises are beneficial in improving chest-wall mobility and vital capacity. Exercise may improve constipation. If exercise reduces physical fatigue in PD remains unclear.

Strength training exercise has been shown to increase manual dexterity in PD patients after exercising with manual putty. This positively affects everyday life when gripping for PD patients.

One of the most widely practiced treatments for speech disorders associated with PD is the Lee Silverman voice treatment (LSVT). Speech therapy and specifically LSVT may improve speech. Occupational therapy (OT) aims to promote health and quality of life by helping people with the disease to participate in as many of their daily living activities as possible. Few studies have been conducted on the effectiveness of OT, and their quality is poor, although with some indication that it may improve motor skills and quality of life for the duration of the therapy.

Palliative care
Palliative care is specialized medical care for people with serious illnesses, including Parkinson's. The goal of this speciality is to improve quality of life for both the person with PD and the family by providing relief from the symptoms, pain, and stress of illnesses. As Parkinson's is not a curable disease, all treatments are focused on slowing decline and improving quality of life, and are therefore palliative in nature.

Palliative care should be involved earlier, rather than later, in the disease course. Palliative care specialists can help with physical symptoms, emotional factors such as loss of function and jobs, depression, fear, and existential concerns.

Along with offering emotional support to both the affected person and family, palliative care serves an important role in addressing goals of care. People with PD may have many difficult decisions to make as the disease progresses, such as wishes for feeding tube, noninvasive ventilator or tracheostomy, wishes for or against cardiopulmonary resuscitation, and when to use hospice care. Palliative-care team members can help answer questions and guide people with PD on these complex and emotional topics to help them make the best decision based on their own values.

Muscles and nerves that control the digestive process may be affected by PD, resulting in constipation and gastroparesis (food remaining in the stomach for a longer period than normal). A balanced diet, based on periodical nutritional assessments, is recommended, and should be designed to avoid weight loss or gain and minimize the consequences of gastrointestinal dysfunction. As the disease advances, swallowing difficulties (dysphagia) may appear. In such cases, using thickening agents for liquid intake and an upright posture when eating may be useful; both measures reduce the risk of choking. Gastrostomy to deliver food directly into the stomach is possible in severe cases.

Levodopa and proteins use the same transportation system in the intestine and the blood–brain barrier, thereby competing for access. Taking them together results in reduced effectiveness of the drug. Therefore, when levodopa is introduced, excessive protein consumption is discouraged, and a well-balanced Mediterranean diet is recommended. In advanced stages, additional intake of low-protein products such as bread or pasta is recommended for similar reasons. To minimize interaction with proteins, levodopa should be taken 30 minutes before meals. At the same time, regimens for PD restrict proteins during breakfast and lunch, allowing protein intake in the evening.

Prognosis

PD invariably progresses with time. A severity rating method known as the Unified Parkinson's disease rating scale (UPDRS) is the most commonly used metric for a clinical study. A modified version known as the MDS-UPDRS is also sometimes used. An older scaling method known as the Hoehn and Yahr scale (originally published in 1967), and a similar scale known as the Modified Hoehn and Yahr scale, have also been commonly used. The Hoehn and Yahr scale defines five basic stages of progression.

Motor symptoms, if not treated, advance aggressively in the early stages of the disease and more slowly later. Untreated, individuals are expected to lose independent ambulation after an average of eight years and be bedridden after 10 years. However, it is uncommon to find untreated people nowadays. Medication has improved the prognosis of motor symptoms, while at the same time it is a new source of disability, because of the undesired effects of levodopa after years of use. In people taking levodopa, the progression time of symptoms to a stage of high dependency from caregivers may be over 15 years. Predicting what course the disease will take for a given individual is difficult. Age is the best predictor of disease progression. The rate of motor decline is greater in those with less impairment at the time of diagnosis, while cognitive impairment is more frequent in those who are over 70 years of age at symptom onset.

Since current therapies improve motor symptoms, disability at present is mainly related to nonmotor features of the disease. Nevertheless, the relationship between disease progression and disability is not linear. Disability is initially related to motor symptoms. As the disease advances, disability is more related to motor symptoms that do not respond adequately to medication, such as swallowing/speech difficulties, and gait/balance problems; and also to levodopa-induced complications, which appear in up to 50% of individuals after 5 years of levodopa usage. Finally, after ten years most people with the disease have autonomic disturbances, sleep problems, mood alterations and cognitive decline. All of these symptoms, especially cognitive decline, greatly increase disability.

The life expectancy of people with PD is reduced. Mortality ratios are around twice those of unaffected people. Cognitive decline and dementia, old age at onset, a more advanced disease state, and presence of swallowing problems are all mortality risk factors. A disease pattern mainly characterized by tremor as opposed to rigidity, though, predicts an improved survival. Death from aspiration pneumonia is twice as common in individuals with PD as in the healthy population.

In 2016, PD resulted in about 211,000 deaths globally, an increase of 161% since 1990. The overall death rate increased by 19% to 1.81 per 100,000 people during that time.

Epidemiology

PD is the second most common neurodegenerative disorder after Alzheimer's disease and affects approximately seven million people globally and one million people in the United States. The proportion in a population at a given time is about 0.3% in industrialized countries. PD is more common in the elderly and rates rise from 1% in those over 60 years of age to 4% of the population over 80. The mean age of onset is around 60 years, although 5–10% of cases, classified as young onset PD, begin between the ages of 20 and 50. Males are more often affected than females at a ratio of around 3:2. PD may be less prevalent in those of African and Asian ancestry, although this finding is disputed. The number of new cases per year of PD is between 8 and 18 per 100,000 person–years.

The age-adjusted rate of Parkinson's disease in Estonia is 28.0/100,000 person years. The Estonian rate has been stable between 2000 and 2019. The incidence of Parkinson's disease has increased in China. It is estimated that China will have nearly half of the Parkinson's disease population in the world in 2030. By 2040 the number of patients is expected to grow to approximately 14 million people; this growth has been referred to as the Parkinson's pandemic.

History

Several early sources, including an Egyptian papyrus, an Ayurvedic medical treatise, the Bible, and Galen's writings, describe symptoms resembling those of PD. After Galen there are no references unambiguously related to PD until the 17th century. In the 17th and 18th centuries, several authors wrote about elements of the disease, including Sylvius, Gaubius, Hunter and Chomel.

In 1817, an English doctor, James Parkinson, published his essay reporting six cases of paralysis agitans. An Essay on the Shaking Palsy described the characteristic resting tremor, abnormal posture and gait, paralysis and diminished muscle strength, and the way that the disease progresses over time. Early neurologists who made further additions to the knowledge of the disease include Trousseau, Gowers, Kinnier Wilson and Erb, and most notably Jean-Martin Charcot, whose studies between 1868 and 1881 were a landmark in the understanding of the disease. Among other advances, he made the distinction between rigidity, weakness and bradykinesia. He also championed the renaming of the disease in honor of James Parkinson.

In 1912, Frederic Lewy described microscopic particles in affected brains, later named Lewy bodies. In 1919, Konstantin Tretiakoff reported that the substantia nigra was the main cerebral structure affected, but this finding was not widely accepted until it was confirmed by further studies published by Rolf Hassler in 1938. The underlying biochemical changes in the brain were identified in the 1950s, due largely to the work of Arvid Carlsson on the neurotransmitter dopamine and Oleh Hornykiewicz on its role on PD. In 1997, alpha-synuclein was found to be the main component of Lewy bodies by Spillantini, Trojanowski, Goedert and others.

Anticholinergics and surgery (lesioning of the corticospinal pathway or some of the basal ganglia structures) were the only treatments until the arrival of levodopa, which reduced their use dramatically. Levodopa was first synthesized in 1911 by Casimir Funk, but it received little attention until the mid 20th century. It entered clinical practice in 1967 and brought about a revolution in the management of PD. By the late 1980s deep brain stimulation introduced by Alim Louis Benabid and colleagues at Grenoble, France, emerged as a possible treatment.

Society and culture

Cost

The costs of PD to society are high, but precise calculations are difficult due to methodological issues in research and differences between countries. The largest share of direct cost comes from inpatient care and nursing homes, while the share coming from medication is substantially lower. Indirect costs are high, due to reduced productivity and the burden on caregivers. In addition to economic costs, PD reduces quality of life of those with the disease and their caregivers.

A study based on 2017 data estimated the US economic PD burden at $51.9 billion, including direct medical costs of $25.4 billion and $26.5 billion in indirect and non-medical costs. The Medicare program bears the largest share of medical costs, as most PD patients are over age 65. The projected total economic burden surpasses $79 billion by 2037. These findings highlight the need for interventions to reduce PD incidence, delay disease progression, and alleviate symptom burden that may reduce the future economic burden of PD.

Advocacy
The birthday of James Parkinson, 11 April, has been designated as World Parkinson's Day. A red tulip was chosen by international organizations as the symbol of the disease in 2005; it represents the 'James Parkinson' tulip cultivar, registered in 1981 by a Dutch horticulturalist. Advocacy organizations include the National Parkinson Foundation, which has provided more than $180 million in care, research, and support services since 1982, Parkinson's Disease Foundation, which has distributed more than $115 million for research and nearly $50 million for education and advocacy programs since its founding in 1957 by William Black; the American Parkinson Disease Association, founded in 1961; and the European Parkinson's Disease Association, founded in 1992.

Notable cases

Actor Michael J. Fox has PD and has greatly increased the public awareness of the disease. After diagnosis, Fox embraced his Parkinson's in television roles, sometimes acting without medication, to further illustrate the effects of the condition. He has written four autobiographies in which his fight against the disease plays a major role, and appeared before the United States Congress without medication to illustrate the effects of the disease. The Michael J. Fox Foundation aims to develop a cure for Parkinson's disease. Fox received an honorary doctorate in medicine from Karolinska Institutet for his contributions to research in Parkinson's disease.

Professional cyclist and Olympic medalist Davis Phinney, who was diagnosed with young-onset Parkinson's at age 40, started the Davis Phinney Foundation in 2004 to support PD research, focusing on quality of life for people with the disease.

Boxer Muhammad Ali showed signs of PD when he was 38, but was not diagnosed until he was 42, and has been called the "world's most famous Parkinson's patient". Whether he had PD or parkinsonism related to boxing is unresolved.

At the time of his suicide in 2014, Robin Williams, the American actor and comedian, had been diagnosed with PD. According to his widow, his autopsy found diffuse Lewy body disease, while the autopsy used the term diffuse Lewy body dementia. Dennis Dickson, a spokesperson for the Lewy Body Dementia Association, clarified the distinction by stating that diffuse Lewy body dementia is more commonly called diffuse Lewy body disease and refers to the underlying disease process. Ian G. McKeith, professor and researcher of Lewy body dementias, commented that Williams' symptoms and autopsy findings were explained by dementia with Lewy bodies.

Research

As of 2022, no disease-modifying drugs (drugs that target the causes or damage) are approved for Parkinson's, so this is a major focus of Parkinson's research. Active research directions include the search for new animal models of the disease and studies of the potential usefulness of gene therapy, stem cell transplants, and neuroprotective agents. To aid in earlier diagnosis, research criteria for identifying prodromal biomarkers of the disease have been established.

The role of the gut–brain axis and the gut flora in PD are recognized but the mechanism leading to gastrointestinal symptoms is unclear.

Gene therapy

Gene therapy typically involves the use of a noninfectious virus (i.e., a viral vector such as the adeno-associated virus) to shuttle genetic material into a part of the brain. Several approaches have been tried. These approaches have involved the expression of growth factors to try to prevent damage (Neurturin – a GDNF-family growth factor), and enzymes such as glutamic acid decarboxylase (GAD – the enzyme that produces GABA), tyrosine hydroxylase (the enzyme that produces L-DOPA) and catechol-O-methyl transferase (COMT – the enzyme that converts L-DOPA to dopamine). There have been no reported safety concerns, but the approaches have largely failed in phase 2 clinical trials. The delivery of GAD showed promise in phase 2 trials in 2011, but whilst effective at improving motor function, was inferior to DBS. Follow-up studies in the same cohort have suggested persistent improvement.

Neuroprotective treatments

A vaccine that primes the human immune system to destroy alpha-synuclein, PD01A (developed by Austrian company, Affiris), entered clinical trials and a phase 1 report in 2020 suggested safety and tolerability. In 2018, an antibody, PRX002/RG7935, showed preliminary safety evidence in stage I trials supporting continuation to stage II trials.

Cell-based therapies

Since early in the 1980s, fetal, porcine, carotid or retinal tissues have been used in cell transplants, in which dissociated cells are injected into the substantia nigra in the hope that they will incorporate themselves into the brain in a way that replaces the dopamine-producing cells that have been lost. These sources of tissues have been largely replaced by induced pluripotent stem cell derived dopaminergic neurons, as this is thought to represent a more feasible source of tissue. Initial evidence showed mesencephalic dopamine-producing cell transplants being beneficial, but double-blind trials to date have not determined a long-term benefit. An additional significant problem was the excess release of dopamine by the transplanted tissue, leading to dyskinesia. In 2020, a first in human clinical trial reported the transplantation of induced pluripotent stem cells into the brain of a person with PD.

Pharmaceutical

Ventures have been undertaken to explore antagonists of adenosine receptors (specifically A2A) as an avenue for novel drugs for Parkinson's. Of these, istradefylline has emerged as the most successful medication and was approved for medical use in the United States in 2019. It is approved as an add-on treatment to the levodopa/carbidopa regime.

References

External links 

  – links to several sites including
 Parkinson's disease at Mayo Clinic
 Parkinson's disease at NHS
 Parkinson's Disease: Hope Through Research (National Institute of Neurological Disorders and Stroke)
 PDGENE – Database for Parkinson's Disease genetic association studies
 World Parkinson Disease Association

 
Aging-associated diseases
Ailments of unknown cause
Geriatrics
Neurodegenerative disorders
Cytoskeletal defects
Wikipedia medicine articles ready to translate
Wikipedia neurology articles ready to translate
Diseases named for discoverer